This is a list of articles dedicated to military actions involving the Portuguese east of the Cape of Good Hope, in Africa or in Asia, on land or at sea, between the 16th and 20th centuries.

16th century
 1501 - First Battle of Cannanore 
 1503 - Battle of Calicut
 1504 - Battle of Pandarane, Battle of Cochin
 1506 - Second Battle of Cannanore, Siege of Angediva
 1507 - Battle of Barawa, Portuguese conquest of Ormuz, Siege of Cannanore
 1508 - Battle of Chaul, Battle of Dabul
 1509 - Battle of Diu
 1510 - Portuguese conquest of Goa
 1511 - Portuguese conquest of Malacca 
 1513 - Siege of Aden
 1517 - Siege of Jeddah 
 1521 - Battle of Tamão 
 1522 - Battle of Veniaga Island 
 1525 - Battle of Lingga 
 1526 - Siege of Bintan, Siege of Calicut
 1531 - Siege of Diu
 1535 - Battle of Ugentana 
 1536 - Second Battle of Ugentana
 1538 - Siege of Diu
 1541 - Battle of Suakin, Battle of El Tor, Battle of Suez (1541)
 1542 - Battle of Benadir, Battle of Baçente,  Battle of Jarte, Battle of the Hill of the Jews, Battle of Wofla
 1542 - Battle of Wayna Daga 
 1546 - Siege of Diu
 1548 - Aden Revolt, Battle of Ash-Shihr
 1551 - Siege of Qatif
 1552 - Battle of Muscat
 1553 - Battle of the Strait of Hormuz
 1554 - Battle of the Gulf of Oman
 1557 - Siege of Kotte
 1559 - Siege of Bahrain, Battle of Mulleriyawa
 1560 - First Jaffna Campaign
 1561 - Siege of Moji 
 1565 - Battle of Fukuda Bay
 1568 - Siege of Malacca 
 1569 - Battle of Aceh
 1571 - Siege of Chaliyam
 1581 - Siege of Daman (1581)
 1586 - Ottoman–Portuguese conflicts (1586–1589)
 1587 - Siege of Johor
 1591 - Second Jaffna Campaign
 1594 - Campaign of Danture

17th century
 1601 - Battle of Bantam 
 1606 - Siege of Malacca, Battle of Cape Rachado
 1610 - Nossa Senhora da Graça incident 
 1612 - Battle of Swally, Kandyan commerce raiding against Portugal (1612–1613) 
 1619 - Portuguese conquest of the Jaffna kingdom 
 1622 - Anglo-Persian capture of Ormuz, Battle of Macau
 1625 - Action of 1 February 1625
 1629 - Battle of Duyon River
 1630 - Battle of Randeniwela
 1632 - Siege of Hooghly
 1638 - Battle of Gannoruwa, Battle of Goa (1638), Siege of Daman (1638-1639) 
 1639 - Action of 30 September 1639
 1640 - Siege of Galle
 1641 - Siege of Malacca
 1654 - Action of 23 March 1654, Action of 2 May 1654 
 1682 - Siege of Goa
 1693 - Battle of Bassein
 1696-1698 - Siege of Fort Jesus

18th century
 1738 - Battle of Vasai
 1746 - Siege of Alorna, Siege of Tiracol
 1752 - Naval Battle of Calicut

19th century
 1809-1810 - Battle of the Tiger's Mouth 
 1846 - Revolt of the Faitiões
 1849 - Passaleão incident

20th century
 1942–1943 - Battle of Timor
 1961 - Annexation of Goa
 1964-1974 - Mozambican War of Independence

See also
 Portuguese Empire
 Portuguese India
 Military history of Portugal

References

Lists of battles
History-related lists
History of Portugal
History of the Portuguese Empire
Military history of Portugal